Samanth Subramanian is an Indian writer and journalist based in London. He studied journalism at Penn State University and international relations at Columbia University. In 2018–19, he was a Leon Levy Fellow at the City University of New York. He is also a regular contributor to The New Yorker, The New York Times, The Guardian and WIRED.

Author 
Subramanian's first book Following Fish: Travels Around the Indian Coast (2010, Penguin Books India) was a travelogue about Indian fisheries and seafood cuisine.

His second book This Divided Island: Stories from the Sri Lankan Civil War (2015, Atlantic Books) was nominated for the Samuel Johnson Prize and the Royal Society of Literature's Ondaatje Prize. He became only the second Indian writer after Suketu Mehta to be nominated for this prestigious award for literary non-fiction. William Dalrymple, writing in The Guardian, considered it a remarkable and moving portrayal of the agonies of the conflict that "will stand as a fine literary monument against the government’s attempt at imposed forgetfulness".

His third major work, A Dominant Character: The Radical Science and Restless Politics of J. B. S. Haldane (2019) is a biography of J. B. S. Haldane. The book has been selected as one of the 100 Notable Books of 2020 by The New York Times.

His articles cover a wide variety of subjects ranging from land reclamation in Singapore to Tamil pulp fiction.

References

External links 
 
 
 Samanth Subramanian on The New Yorker
 Samanth Subramanian on The Guardian

Living people
Indian male journalists
21st-century Indian writers
Donald P. Bellisario College of Communications alumni
Year of birth missing (living people)